The UAE Touring Car Championship is a touring car racing series that takes place each year in the United Arab Emirates.
 
The UAETCC consists of three classes. Class 1 uses cars built to Super 2000 or BTC Touring regulations. Class 2 uses Super Production regulations for cars with engine capacities of not more than 2000cc. Class 3 is a 1600cc class and is the most production-based of the three. From the season 2011-2012 Class 3 became Clio Cup class using the Clio Cup 195 & 200 Cup cars based on the X85 chassis, while from the season 2018–19, the national championship introduced a TCR class in races and whole Championship renamed in 2019-2020 season as UAE Procar Championship in order to accommodate GT Cars in the same grid.

Champions

References
2. https://dubaiautodrome.ae/motorsport/

3. https://dubaiautodrome.ae/track-talk/

Touring car racing series
TCR Series
Motorsport competitions in the United Arab Emirates